Clos de la Coulée de Serrant is a French wine AOC and  monopole. The winemaker is  Nicolas Joly, who specializes in biodynamic wine.

Coulée de Serrant is among the very few single-owner French winery properties to be granted its own AOC; others include Romanée-Conti, La Tâche AOC, and Château-Grillet AOC.

References

Loire Valley
French wine AOCs